Susan Carol Holland (born 27 May 1956) is an Italian-British billionaire businesswoman, and the chairman of Amplifon, an Italian hearing aid retailer founded by in Milan in 1950 by her father Algernon Charles Holland.

Early life
Holland earned a bachelor's degree in psychology and sociology from Keele University, followed by a diploma in Logopaedia from the Universita degli Studi di Milano.

Career
From 1982, she worked as a speech therapist in Milan.

In 1988, she became a director of Amplifon SpA, and in 1993, non-executive vice-chair.

She owns 44.9% of Amplifon through her family's holding company.

In August 2018, Bloomberg estimated her net worth at US$2.3 billion.

References

Living people
1956 births
Italian billionaires
British billionaires
Alumni of Keele University